Please Come Back, Soon-ae is a 2006 South Korean television series that aired on SBS from July 12 to August 31, 2006 on Wednesdays and Thursdays at 21:55 for 16 episodes. In this comedy-drama starring Shim Hye-jin and Park Jin-hee, a body switch occurs between two women, forcing them to live the other's life and understand each other.

Plot
Heo Soon-ae is a 40-year-old homemaker devoted to her pilot husband Yoon Il-seok, their son, and Il-seok's mother who lives with them. But one day Soon-ae discovers that her husband has been cheating on her with a 28-year-old flight attendant, Han Cho-eun. Cho-eun confronts Soon-ae to convince her to divorce Il-seok so she can take her place. The two get into a car together and drive towards the airport where Il-seok is due to arrive from a flight; the plan is to show up in front of Il-seok together and ask him directly who he wants to be with. The plot turns supernatural, however, when the two women fall victim to an accident that switches their identities; Soon-ae becomes trapped in Cho-eun's body, and vice versa. Since they can't seem to change back the two must learn to live in each other's body, posing as the other woman.

Cast

Main characters
 Shim Hye-jin as Heo Soon-ae (Age: 40)
 Park Jin-hee as Han Cho-eun (Age: 28)
 Lee Jae-hwang as Jang Hyeon-woo (Age: 32)
 Yoon Da-hoon as Yoon Il-seok (Age: 42)

Supporting characters
 Jung Jae-soon as Yeo Myung-ja (Age: 65)
 Kwon Hae-hyo as Han Hyun-jong (Cho-eun's uncle)
 Park Mi-sun as Park Jung-sook (Age: 40)
 Ahn Moon-sook as Jo Dae-sook
 Lee Seon-jin as Kang Eun-kyung (Age: 30)
 Kim Hyung-bum as Seo Joon-ho (Age: 30)
 Hwang Ji-hyun as Lee So-myung
 Jang Ji-woo as Han Jae-woong (Cho-eun's brother)
 Shin Dong-woo as Yoon Chan
 Sung Dong-il as airline passenger
 Park Si-yeon as flight attendant on last airplane (guest appearance)
 Kim Kwang-kyu as male harassing passenger on airplane

Remake
A Russian remake titled Немного не в себе ("In the Wrong Skin") aired on Channel One from August 29 to September 15, 2011 for 12 episodes.

An Indonesian remake was titled Pacarku bukan istriku.

See also
List of Korean television shows
Contemporary culture of South Korea

References

External links
 Please Come Back, Soon-ae official SBS website 
 

Korean-language television shows
2006 South Korean television series debuts
Seoul Broadcasting System television dramas
2006 South Korean television series endings
South Korean fantasy television series
South Korean romantic comedy television series
Television series by Doremi Entertainment